Sven-Åke Nilsson (born 13 September 1951) is a Swedish retired road racing cyclist. His sporting career began with CK Ringen Malmö. He was a professional cyclist from 1977 until his retirement in 1984.

For half a decade early in his career he was among the strongest GC Contenders and often among the top 10 overall during the Tour de France while riding for the very strong Miko–Mercier squads, who also included riders like Christian Seznec, Raymond Martin and Joop Zoetemelk. In the 1978 Tour de France he finished 11th, in 1979 12th, 1980 7th and in 1981 he finished 8th. He had a stage win and 3rd place overall in the 1982 Vuelta, and a few months later he rode the Tour for the final time in the 1982 Tour de France, and finished 14th.

Other career highlights include two stage wins in Paris–Nice and competing at the 1972 Summer Olympics and 1976 Summer Olympics.

Major results

1972
 1st  Road race, National Amateur Road Championships
1974
 1st  Team time trial, UCI Road World Championships
1976
 1st  Overall Tour de l'Avenir
1st Stage 1
1978
 11th Overall Tour de France
1979
 1st Tour de Corse
 1st Étoile des Espoirs
 2nd Overall Paris–Nice
1st Stage 4
 3rd Overall Critérium International
 3rd Amstel Gold Race
 12th Overall Tour de France
1980
 1st Stage 2 Critérium International
 2nd La Flèche Wallonne
 7th Overall Tour de France
1981
 1st  Overall Setmana Catalana de Ciclisme
 8th Overall Tour de France
1982
 1st Stage 2 Paris–Nice
 3rd Overall Vuelta a España
1st Stage 10
 14th Overall Tour de France
1983
 2nd Giro della Romagna

References

External links

1951 births
Living people
Sportspeople from Malmö
Swedish male cyclists
Cyclists at the 1972 Summer Olympics
Cyclists at the 1976 Summer Olympics
Olympic cyclists of Sweden
Swedish Vuelta a España stage winners
UCI Road World Champions (elite men)
20th-century Swedish people